Tiberio Muscettola, C.O. (born 1637) was a Roman Catholic prelate who served as Archbishop of Manfredonia (1680–1708).

Biography
Tiberio Muscettola was born in 1637 in Naples, Italy and ordained a priest in the Oratory of Saint Philip Neri.
On 13 May 1680, he was appointed during the papacy of Pope Pius VI as Archbishop of Manfredonia.
On 19 May 1680, he was consecrated bishop by Pietro Francesco Orsini de Gravina, Bishop of Cesena, with Stefano Brancaccio, Bishop of Viterbo e Tuscania, and Ludovico della Quadra, Bishop of Mottola, serving as co-consecrators. 
He served as Archbishop of Manfredonia until his resignation on 25 February 1708.

References

External links and additional sources
 (for Chronology of Bishops) 
 (for Chronology of Bishops)  

17th-century Italian Roman Catholic archbishops
18th-century Italian Roman Catholic archbishops
Bishops appointed by Pope Pius VI
1637 births
Clergy from Naples
Oratorian bishops
18th-century deaths